Iodyrite or iodargyrite is a natural mineral form of silver iodide.

Related minerals are chlorargyrite and bromargyrite.

References 

Halide minerals
Silver minerals
Hexagonal minerals
Minerals in space group 183